Ismael may refer to:

People
 Ismael Balkhi, a political activist from Afghanistan
 Ismael Blanco  (born 1983), an Argentine professional footballer
 Ismael Prego "Wismichu", a Spanish youtuber
 Ismael Villegas, a Puerto Rican Major League Baseball player

Other uses
 Ismael, Sar-e Pol, a village in Afghanistan
 Ismael (film), a 2013 Spanish film
 Ismael (novel), a 1977 novel by Klas Östergren

See also
 Ismaël
 Ysmael (disambiguation)
 Isfael, Welsh bishop and saint
 Ishmael (disambiguation)
 Ismail (disambiguation)
 Ismail (name)